Alexandrovka is a rural locality (a village) in Sukhonskoye Rural Settlement, Mezhdurechensky District, Vologda Oblast, Russia. The population was 2 as of 2002.

Geography 
Alexandrovka is located 3 km east of Shuyskoye (the district's administrative centre) by road. Malaya Storona is the nearest rural locality.

References 

Rural localities in Mezhdurechensky District, Vologda Oblast